WPSR (90.7 FM) is a non-commercial radio station broadcasting a Variety format. Licensed to Evansville, Indiana, the station is currently owned by the Evansville Vanderburgh School Corporation as a high school radio station. The station is also broadcast on HD radio.

The station initially only broadcast from 6:45 a.m.–2:45 p.m. on school days when it went on the air in the 1950s. In the 1990s, broadcasts were expanded until midnight every night. During the non-school hours, the station would play automated 1980s music. Originally located in Central High School, the station is now a full 24/7 service broadcasting from the Southern Indiana Career & Technical Center in Evansville, Indiana.

References

External links
90.7 WPSR Facebook

PSR